1820 in sports describes the year's events in world sport.

Boxing
Events
 1 February — Tom Cribb retains his English championship with a first-round knockout of Jack Carter in London.

Cricket
Events
 William Ward scores 278 for MCC v. Norfolk at Lord's, the first known double century and a new world record for the highest individual innings in all forms of cricket, beating James Aylward's score of 167 in 1777.  However, the match is not universally recognised as first-class.
 The original Northamptonshire CCC was founded in 1820 but was subject to substantial reorganisation and reformation in 1878
 Earliest mention of wicketkeeping gloves
England
 Most runs – William Ward 361 (HS 278)
 Most wickets – George Coles 17 (BB 6–?)

Horse racing
England
 1,000 Guineas Stakes – Rowena 
 2,000 Guineas Stakes – Pindarrie
 The Derby – Sailor
 The Oaks – Caroline 
 St. Leger Stakes – St Patrick

References

 
1820